Ivan Triesault (born Johann Constantin Treisalt;  in Reval (now Tallinn) – January 3, 1980 in Los Angeles) was an Estonian-American actor. His parents were from the island of Hiiumaa.

Life
His first stage appearance was at the German Theatre in Tallinn aged 14, before moving to the United States aged 18. There he began to train in acting and dance, working on Broadway before moving into film. His notable roles include appearances in Cry of the Werewolf (1944), The Story of Dr. Wassell (1944), A Song to Remember (1945), Notorious (1946), 5 Fingers (1952), Jet Pilot (1957), Journey to the Center of the Earth (1959), The 300 Spartans (1962), It Happened in Athens (1962), Von Ryan's Express (1965), Batman (1966) and The Wild Wild West. He died in 1980 due to cardiac failure at age 81.

Filmography

References

External links
 
 

1898 births
1980 deaths
Male actors from Tallinn
People from the Governorate of Estonia
Estonian male stage actors
Estonian emigrants to the United States
Emigrants from the Russian Empire to the United States
Estonian male film actors
American male film actors
20th-century American male actors
20th-century Estonian male actors